Maximilian Alexander Chilton (born 21 April 1991) is a British racing driver who last competed for Carlin Motorsport in the IndyCar Series, before announcing his retirement from IndyCar in February 2022. Prior to IndyCar, he competed in Formula One, driving for Marussia F1 in 2013 and 2014. In 2012, he raced in the GP2 series for Marussia-backed Carlin Motorsport.

He is the current holder of the Goodwood Festival of Speed hill climb record. 

His brother Tom is also a racing driver, currently competing in the British Touring Car Championship.

Early life
Chilton was born in Redhill and grew up in Reigate. His father, Grahame Chilton, is a businessman who co-owned the insurance company Benfield Group until 2008, when it was taken over by Aon plc for £738m. Chilton became vice-chairman of Aon after the deal and also collected around £77m for his stake. Max Chilton was educated at Ardingly College from 2000 to 2008. His brother, Tom Chilton, is also a racing driver.

Career

Karting
Chilton started his racing career at the age of 10 in karts where he spent 2 years learning the ropes in cadet karting before stepping up to junior TKM. He started to make a name for himself with J.I.C.A, where he made regular appearances on the podium, before turning his attention to car racing at the age of 14. Throughout this period Chilton was racing in the Super 1 National Kart Championships.

T Cars
He dovetailed his 2005 karting season with a season in the T Cars championship, for drivers between fourteen and seventeen years of age. He finished eighth in his first season, before going on to finish third in the Autumn Trophy. He continued in T Cars in 2006, where he finished as runner-up to Luciano Bacheta by three points. He won seven races to Bacheta's six.

Formula Three

Chilton made his debut at the second round of the 2007 British Formula 3 season for Arena International, despite being below the required age of 16 to take part in the season opener having sought special dispensation on the eve of his 16th birthday. His best result was eleventh, in Bucharest and at Brands Hatch. He made one appearance in the Star Mazda Championship, at Laguna Seca – because he was a guest driver, Chilton was ineligible for points. He drove in the 2007 1000km of Silverstone for Arena with his brother Tom, and they finished sixth overall, eight laps down on the winning Peugeot 908 HDi FAP of Nicolas Minassian and Marc Gené.

For 2008 Chilton moved to David Hayle's Hitech Racing, and improved to tenth place in the championship. He recorded pole positions at Monza and Rockingham, and scored two podiums – second in the opening race at Oulton Park and third at Rockingham. He moved to Carlin Motorsport for the 2009 season, taking three pole positions in the first four races. He won twice during the season, the first at the Autódromo Internacional do Algarve in Portimão, and the second in his final Formula Three race at Brands Hatch.

GP2 Series

Chilton graduated to the GP2 Asia Series for the 2009–10 season, driving for Barwa Addax. From there Chilton moved to Ocean Racing Technology for the 2010 GP2 Series season championship with the highest place finish of 5th.

In 2011 Chilton joined his father's Carlin team for the outfit's first foray into GP2, having previously driven for them in Formula Three. Partnered variously by reigning Formula Renault 3.5 Series champion Mikhail Aleshin and Álvaro Parente, he finished 22nd in the Asia series and 20th in the main series. He remained with the team, now with backing from the Marussia Formula One team, for the 2012 season alongside Rio Haryanto. He secured his first series podium finish in the feature race of the first round of the championship in Malaysia, and later his first pole position and race victory in the Hungarian feature race. This improvement in form, together with consistent points-scoring finishes throughout the season, resulted in Chilton rising to fourth place in the drivers' championship.

Formula One

Force India (2011)

In November 2011 Chilton drove for the Force India team in the Young Driver test at Abu Dhabi's Yas Marina Circuit. This was his second time driving Formula One machinery following a straight-line aerodynamic test for the team earlier in the year.

Marussia (2012–14)

Chilton was appointed Marussia F1's testing and reserve driver for the second half of the 2012 season, starting from the Japanese Grand Prix. Chilton competed in the first practice session at the 2012 Abu Dhabi Grand Prix in November for Marussia F1.

In December 2012, Nikolai Fomenko, the engineering director of Marussia F1, announced that Chilton would race for the team full-time in 2013. The team confirmed the next day that Chilton would race. Chilton qualified 20th on his debut at the Australian GP. He achieved his best finish of the season at the 2013 Monaco Grand Prix, when he finished in 14th place following several retirements. He achieved his best qualifying result of 16th position at the 2013 Belgian Grand Prix in a mixed-weather session where he was one of three drivers to go out on slick tyres at the end when the track's condition was improving.

Chilton is the only driver to have finished every race of his rookie season.

On 11 January it was announced that Marussia F1 would be retaining Chilton for the  season.

Chilton had finished every Formula One race he had contested until the 2014 Canadian Grand Prix, which meant that he had finished 25 consecutive races, 19 of them in his rookie season. This was a record for most classified finishes in a rookie season. Lewis Hamilton holds the record for most consecutive classified finishes at 48. Chilton's Canadian Grand Prix retirement came when he collided with his teammate Jules Bianchi on the first lap, sending the Frenchman into the wall at Turn 4. Chilton received a three-place grid penalty at the following race. His season ended after Marussia went into administration and then closed down, resulting in Chilton missing the last three races of the season and having no seat for 2015.

IndyCar

Indy Lights
With no F1 seat for 2015, Chilton returned to Carlin for testing in order to assist them with their Indy Lights efforts, planning to move on to a full IndyCar Series drive in 2016. Chilton's maiden Indy Lights pole position and race win, taking place on the same weekend as Jules Bianchi's death, was dedicated to his former Formula One teammate and karting rival.

IndyCar Series

Chip Ganassi (2016–2017) 

On 1 February 2016, Chilton joined Chip Ganassi Racing to compete in the IndyCar Series.

In the 2017 Indianapolis 500, Chilton dominated the latter part of the race and led 47 of the last 72 laps, but ultimately finished fourth. Chilton led the most laps total with 50.

Carlin (2018–2021) 
On 13 December 2017 it was announced that Chilton would race for Carlin Motorsport for the 2018 IndyCar Series.

On 6 June 2019, it was announced that Chilton would no longer run races on oval tracks, with the exception of the Indy 500. Conor Daly would run the remainder of the Oval races for the 2019 season for Carlin Motorsport.

In February 2022, Chilton announced his retirement from IndyCar racing, in order to concentrate on other ventures, including the Le Mans Endurance Race.

World Endurance Championship

Nissan (2015)
Chilton joined Nissan Motorsports to compete in the FIA World Endurance Championship in 2015. Chilton ran the 24 Hours of Le Mans for the team, retiring after 234 laps due to a suspension failure.

GT Racing

Super GT (2022)

Chilton was assigned by Ryo Michigami to be the test driver of the BUSOU Drago Corse Nissan GT-R Nismo GT3 which had been driven by Masataka Yanagida and Yuji Ide, the team placed Chilton has their third driver in Endurance races during the season.

Racing record

Career summary

* Season still in progress.

Complete GP2 Series results
(key) (Races in bold indicate pole position; races in italics indicate fastest lap)

Complete GP2 Asia Series results
(key) (Races in bold indicate pole position; races in italics indicate fastest lap)

Complete GP2 Final results
(key) (Races in bold indicate pole position) (Races in italics indicate fastest lap)

Complete Formula One results
(key) (Races in bold indicate pole position; races in italics indicates fastest lap)

American open-wheel racing results

Indy Lights

IndyCar Series
(key)

Indianapolis 500

Complete FIA World Endurance Championship results

Complete 24 Hours of Le Mans results

Complete 300km of Suzuka results

Complete Super GT Series results

References

External links

 
 
 

1991 births
Living people
People from Reigate
People educated at Ardingly College
English racing drivers
English Formula One drivers
24 Hours of Le Mans drivers
British Formula Three Championship drivers
GP2 Asia Series drivers
European Le Mans Series drivers
GP2 Series drivers
World Series Formula V8 3.5 drivers
Marussia Formula One drivers
Indy Lights drivers
IndyCar Series drivers
Indianapolis 500 drivers
Arena Motorsport drivers
Hitech Grand Prix drivers
Carlin racing drivers
Comtec Racing drivers
Ocean Racing Technology drivers
Manor Motorsport drivers
Chip Ganassi Racing drivers
Super GT drivers
Nismo drivers